Guma Mousa (born 1 January 1978 in Libya) is a Libyan footballer who plays for Al-Ahly Tripoli as a goalkeeper. He is a member of Libya national football team, played at 2012 Africa Cup of Nations as a reserve player.

References

External links

1978 births
Living people
Libyan footballers
Libya international footballers
Association football goalkeepers
2012 Africa Cup of Nations players